is a Japanese hurdler. She competed at the 2012 Summer Olympics in the 100 meter hurdles, and failed to reach the final. She won a gold, a bronze and a silver medal in this event at the Asian championships in 2013, 2015 and 2017, respectively.

Competition record

References

External links 

  
 

1988 births
Living people
Sportspeople from Hiroshima
Japanese female hurdlers
Olympic female hurdlers
Olympic athletes of Japan
Athletes (track and field) at the 2012 Summer Olympics
Asian Games bronze medalists for Japan
Asian Games medalists in athletics (track and field)
Athletes (track and field) at the 2014 Asian Games
Medalists at the 2014 Asian Games
World Athletics Championships athletes for Japan
Asian Athletics Championships winners
Japan Championships in Athletics winners
Yokohama National University alumni
Athletes (track and field) at the 2020 Summer Olympics
20th-century Japanese women
21st-century Japanese women